Emilio T. Yap Sr., GCLH (September 24, 1925 – April 7, 2014) was a Chinese Filipino business tycoon and philanthropist. He was the chairman of the board of the Manila Bulletin.

Biography
Emilio Yap, who was of Chinese descent, was born on September 24, 1925 in Fujian Province, China; he would move to the Philippines where he would study and work in a business owned by his grandfather in Manila, then went to Dumaguete to work as a shopkeeper. He began his business career in 1942.

Career
In July 1984, Yap was elected as the chairman of the board of the Manila Bulletin, a position he held until his death in 2014. He was also the vice president of the executive department of the Manila Bulletin. 

Yap was the chairman of Manila Hotel from 1997 until 2014, chairman of Centro Escolar University since 2002, and the chairman emeritus of Philtrust Bank. Forbes ranked Yap as the 15th wealthiest person in the Philippines in 2013, with an estimated net worth of $1.1 billion.

Death and legacy
Yap died on April 7, 2014 at the age of 88, and was buried at the Manila Memorial Park in Parañaque on April 13, 2014.

In August 3, 2015, a facility inside the Philippine Red Cross Tower National Blood Center was named Don Emilio T. Yap Blood Apheresis Center in honor of his charitable works with the organization.

See also
Alfonso A. Uy
Edgar Sia

References

1925 births
2014 deaths
20th-century Filipino businesspeople
20th-century philanthropists
21st-century Filipino businesspeople
Burials at the Manila Memorial Park – Sucat
Filipino billionaires
Filipino business executives
Filipino Catholics
Filipino newspaper executives
Filipino people of Chinese descent
Filipino philanthropists
Manila Bulletin people
Recipients of the Philippine Legion of Honor